Tuomas Rannankari (born 21 May 1991) is a Finnish professional footballer who most recently played Veikkausliiga club Ilves.

Club career 

Rannankari came through the youth system at KuPS. He made his first team debut in the 2009 season, during which he played 13 league games. He also played six games and scored his first goal in the Finnish League Cup in the same season.

On 22 June 2009, he was signed by FC Twente along with KuPS teammate Petteri Pennanen. A three-year contract was agreed. For the 2010–11 season, he was given squad number 42 but did not feature in any first team games.

In December 2011, he went on trial with Greenock Morton.
In July  2012 he signed a contract for  SpVgg Greuther Fürth U23 team which plays in Regionalliga (Fourth level). Rannankari played 31 matches and scored one goal but did not earn a place in Fürth's first team.

In July 2013, Rannankari went on trial with Plymouth Argyle.

After five seasons with KuPS in the Veikkausliiga, Rannankari signed a two-year contract with Ilves in November, 2017. He left the club at the end of 2018.

International career 

Rannankari has gained international recognition at under-17, under-19 and under-21 levels. He played his first game for the Finland under-21s in a 2–3 defeat against the Slovakia under-21s in a March 2011 friendly match.

Rannankari made his senior national team debut on 26 May 2012 in 3−2 victory against Turkey.

References

External links 
 
 Official FC Twente youth team website 

1991 births
Living people
Kuopion Palloseura players
FC Twente players
FC Ilves players
SpVgg Greuther Fürth players
Veikkausliiga players
Finnish footballers
Finland international footballers
Expatriate footballers in the Netherlands
Finnish expatriate footballers
Association football midfielders
People from Kuopio
Sportspeople from North Savo